Valentin Kuklev - (born 11 April 1948, Moscow, Russia) - researcher of semantics, author of books, articles and television broadcasts on symbolism. Soviet and Russian underground activist, philosopher and thinker. Follower of V. Nalimov. Board member of the futurological group futura.ru. Participant of the project "Ways of energy development in Europe", together with DaimlerChrysler; projects "Networked Economy", "Terrorism in the 21st Century" (for the Federation Council of Russia). From 1989-1994, lived in Los Angeles, California, US. Currently lives in Moscow, Russia.


Biography 
In 1972, he began working on the system design in CRI DIAS (Design Institute of Automated Systems) at Gosstroy USSR. At that time - one of the founders of the Electronic Music Studio at the Scriabin Museum. The studio work was carried out to establish a multimedia environment and audio-visual synthesis. At the same time with the participation of V. Kuklev an underground group named "Context" is formed. It includes philosophers, philologists, psychologists. Group's main aim was translation and samizdat publishing of works by famous non-Soviet thinkers, which were officially prohibited by Soviet Government. Among them are works of Carlos Castaneda, J. Lilly, Eric Berne, Friedrich Nietzsche, Buddhist works.

In 1989-1991, Kuklev was the author and screenwriter of the program "The Fifth Wheel" Leningrad TV (1988–1993).

In 1991, he represented Russia at the Fordham University (New York) conference, "The Occult in Modern Russian and Soviet culture" (The Occult in Modern Russian and Soviet Culture, International Conference, Fordham University, New York, June 26–29, 1991).

In 1998, in collaboration with Arkady Rovner and Viktoria Andreeva, Valentin Kuklev wrote and publishes the book "Encyclopedia. Symbols, signs, emblems". Book has five editions with an overall circulation 28.000 copies.

In the period from 1996 to 2002, vice president of the Russian National Innovation Fund - "Technology of the 21st century".

Awards 
 The prize of the First Russian Sretensky movie festival "Meeting" (2006).
 State grant holder of Russia in category: "Outstanding figures of culture and art" (2006–2008).

Bibliography 
 Andreeva, Kuklev, A. Rovner. Encyclopedia. Symbols, signs, posters. Publishers: Astrel, ACT, 2006 624 pages - . . Overall circulation - 28,000 copies.
 Vector art. Almanac, 2006. Book 3. Life as a counterpoint. Publisher: Library of the newspaper "MOL", 2006 256 pages Stories of V. Kuklev "Unjust" and "Simpleton". - S. 71-73. - 
 Arkady Rovner. "The floors of Hades." - [Moscow: "The Myth"] 1992. - 112. Poems. Afterword Valentin Kuklev.
 Bernice Glatzer Rosenthal. The Occult in Russian and Soviet Culture by (1997) Ithaca, NY: Cornell University Press, 1997. vii 468 pp. - P. 416. - , .

References

External links

Videos 
 "Mystery Stories" on RenTV- Valentin Kuklev gives comments.
 Kuklev, S. Moskalev. Interview for portal «New Times» October 16, 2008

1948 births
Living people
Writers from Moscow
Semanticists